Fred O'Donovan may refer to:
 Fred O'Donovan (theatre producer) (1930–2010), Irish theatre producer and businessman
 Fred O'Donovan (actor) (1884–1952), Irish actor, film maker and theatre manager